The U.S. Post Office and Courthouse in Norfolk, Nebraska, United States, was built in 1904.  Designed by James Knox Taylor, it includes Late 19th and 20th Century Revivals architecture.  It served historically as a courthouse, as a correctional facility, and as a post office.  It was listed on the National Register of Historic Places in 1974.

The building is now privately owned, and houses a number of offices.  It has been named the McMill Building, the "McMill" deriving not from a person's name, but from the date in Roman numbers, MCMIII, above the west entrance.

See also
List of United States federal courthouses in Nebraska

References

Buildings and structures in Madison County, Nebraska
Courthouses on the National Register of Historic Places in Nebraska
Government buildings completed in 1904
Post office buildings on the National Register of Historic Places in Nebraska
National Register of Historic Places in Madison County, Nebraska